Mohamed Bolkiah ibni Omar Ali Saifuddien III (born 27 August 1947) is a member of the royal family of Brunei. He is the second son of Omar Ali Saifuddien III, the 28th Sultan of Brunei, and Raja Isteri (Queen) Pengiran Anak Damit. He is the Head of the Brunei’s Viziers. After Brunei’s independence in 1984, he became the country’s first foreign minister, serving from 1 January 1984 until 22 October 2015. He served in the cabinet as the Minister of the Brunei's Ministry of Foreign Affairs and Trade alongside the second Minister of Foreign Affairs and Trade, Lim Jock Seng.

Early life and education
Prince Mohamed Bolkiah was born on 27 August 1947 at Istana Darul Hana, Brunei Town. He is the second son of Sultan Omar Ali Saifuddien Sa'adul Khairi Waddien, the 28th Sultan of Brunei, and his wife, the late Suri Seri Begawan Raja Isteri Pengiran Anak Damit. Among his siblings are the current Sultan of Brunei, Sultan Hassanal Bolkiah, Prince Sufri Bolkiah, Prince Jefri Bolkiah, Princess Masna, Princess Norain, Princess Amal Umi Kalthum Al-Islam, Princess Amal Rakiah, Princess Amal Nasibah and Princess Amal Jefriah. 

Along with his siblings, Mohamed Bolkiah had his early education at the Lapau (the Royal ceremonial building). Afterwards in 1960, he attended his secondary education with his brother Hassanal Bolkiah at Victoria Institution in Kuala Lumpur, Malaysia until 1963. From 1964 until 1965, he studied his GCE 'A' Levels at Omar Ali Saifuddien College, Brunei. From there, he would then be enrolled into Sandhurst Military Academy, United Kingdom. He was commissioned as a junior lieutenant in the Irish Guards, in 1967.

Perdana Wazir 
On 29 September 1967, Mohamed Bolkiah was appointed by his father, Sultan Omar Ali Saifuddien III, as Pengiran Temenggong, one of Brunei's traditional wazirs. In 1970, Mohamed Bolkiah was given by Sultan Hassanal Bolkiah the new title of Perdana Wazir, head of the traditional Brunei wazirs, the "eyes and ears" of the ruler. On 23 September 1974, he was appointed as the honorary Commissioner of Police of the Royal Brunei Police Force (RBPF).

Prince Mohamed Bolkiah was reported to have primary authority over QAF Holdings. Immediately following the independence of Brunei Darussalam in 1984, Mohamed Bolkiah was appointed Minister of Foreign Affairs and Trade. Only until that same year, he was the Pesident of the National Bank of Brunei (NBB). During the cabinet reshuffle on 22 October 2015, he was replaced by his brother, the Sultan himself. He also holds the title of the Chief Vizier (Perdana Wazir) in the Royal Court.

Personal life

Family 
In August 1970, Mohamed Bolkiah married his first cousin, Yang Teramat Mulia (HRH) Pengiran Anak Isteri Pengiran Anak Hajah Zariah binti Al-Marhum Pengiran Pemancha Pengiran Anak Haji Mohamed Alam, the sister of Pengiran Anak Hajah Saleha, the Raja Isteri (Queen). Together they have 10 children whom are;

Bibliography

Legacy

Titles and styles 

 27 August 1947 – 29 September 1967: 
 29 September 1967 – 6 February 1970: 
 Since 6 February 1970:

Military ranks

National 
  1 November 1970: Honorary Lieutenant Colonel, Royal Brunei Malay Regiment
  1 September 1972: Honorary Colonel, Royal Brunei Malay Regiment

Foreign 
:

  1 March 1968: Honorary 2nd Lieutenant, Irish Guards
  16 November 1985: Honorary Lieutenant, Irish Guards

Namesakes
 Mohamed Bolkiah Mosque, a mosque in Kampong Serusop.
 Pengiran Muda Mohammed Bolkiah Religious School, a religious school in Temburong District.

Honours
Mohamed Bolkiah has received the following honours;

National 

  Royal Family Order of the Crown of Brunei (DKMB)
  Family Order of Laila Utama (DK) – Dato Laila Utama (1963)
  Sultan Hassanal Bolkiah Medal (PHBS) – (1 August 1968)
  Armed Forces Service Medal (PBLI) – (1975)
  Meritorious Service Medal (PJK) – (1954)
  Sultan Golden Jubilee Medal – (5 October 2017)

Foreign 
 :
  Order of the Rising Sun Grand Cordon – (2009)
 :
  Royal Family Order of Kelantan (DK) – (24 October 2022)
  Order of the Crown of Johor (SPMJ) – Dato' Sri Paduka
  Order of Sultan Ahmad Shah Grand Knight (SSAP) – Dato' Sri
  Order of Cura Si Manja Kini Grand Knight (SPCM) – Dato' Seri
  Order of Sultan Salahuddin Abdul Aziz Shah Companion (SSA)
 :
  Order of St Michael and St George Honorary Knight Grand Cross (GCMG) – Sir (17 September 1998)
  Royal Victorian Order Honorary Commander (CVO) – (29 February 1972)
 :
  Order of Merit of the Federal Republic of Germany Grand Cross – (16 November 1985)
 :
  Order of Diplomatic Service Merit First Grade
 :
  Order of the White Elephant Knight Grand Cross (PCh (KCE))
 :
  Order of the Golden Heart Grand Cross (GCrGH) – (1 August 2007)

Notes

External links
  Brunei Ministry of Foreign Affairs, organisation
 Interview with Foreign Minister Mohamed Bolkiah

Bruneian royalty
1948 births
Living people
Foreign ministers of Brunei
Members of the Legislative Council of Brunei
Sons of monarchs

Mohamed
Mohamed
Recipients of the Order of the Rising Sun